Llonín is one of eight parishes (administrative divisions) in Peñamellera Alta, a municipality within the province and autonomous community of Asturias, in northern Spain.

The population is 83 (INE 2007).

Parishes in Peñamellera Alta